Bob Gibbons is an American talent scout specializing in American high school basketball players.  He is based in Lenoir, North Carolina.

Gibbons founded All-Star Sports in 1974. Before that, he was a high school player and coach.  He is one of those who is credited with transforming scouting of school-age basketball stars into an industry.

Gibbons publishes an annual ranking of the top 150 high school players in the U.S., as well as separate rankings of seniors, juniors, sophomores, and freshmen.  He has also been on committees that select players for the annual McDonald's High School All-American Game and the Nike Hoop Summit.

External links
All-Star Sports website
 https://greensboro.com/gibbons-high-court-opinions/article_655723f7-8ac6-5060-9f1a-0ceee1e4841f.html

Living people
Year of birth missing (living people)
People from Lenoir, North Carolina